Donald Wrye (September 24, 1934 – May 15, 2015) was an American director, screenwriter and producer. He is best known for directing the 1978 film Ice Castles. He died on May 15, 2015, at his home in Harrisburg, Pennsylvania.

Filmography
1966: Destination Safety (TV documentary)
1968: Men From Boys: The First Eight Weeks (TV documentary)
1968: California (TV documentary)
1969: An Impression of John Steinbeck: Writer (documentary)
1971: The Numbers Start with the River (documentary)
1973: The Man Who Could Talk to Kids (TV movie)
1974: Born Innocent (TV movie)
1975: Death Be Not Proud (TV movie)
1975: The Entertainer (TV movie)
1977: It Happened One Christmas (TV movie)
1978: Ice Castles
1981: Fire on the Mountain (TV movie)
1982: Divorce Wars: A Love Story (TV movie)
1983: The Face of Rage (TV movie)
1983: Heart of Steel (TV movie)
1984: The House of God
1987: Amerika (TV miniseries)
1990: 83 Hours 'Til Dawn (TV movie)
1991: Lucky Day (TV movie)
1991: Stranger in the Family (TV movie)
1993: Broken Promises: Taking Emily Back (TV movie)
1994: Ultimate Betrayal (TV movie)
1994: Separated by Murder (TV movie)
1995: A Family Divided (TV movie)
1996: Trail of Tears (TV movie)
1997: Not in This Town (TV movie)
1997: High Stakes (TV movie)
2000: Range of Motion (TV movie)
2000: A Vision of Murder: The Story of Donielle (TV movie)
2010: Ice Castles

Notes
Ice Castle (2010) is a direct-to-video remake

References

External links

1934 births
2015 deaths
American male screenwriters
Writers from Riverside, California
Film directors from California
Screenwriters from California